Rhinella cerradensis is a species of toad in the family Bufonidae. It lives in South America.

References 

cerradensis
Amphibians of South America
Amphibians described in 2007